Mason Ferlic (born August 5, 1993) is an American long-distance runner.

Running Career 
In 2019, he competed in the senior men's race at the 2019 IAAF World Cross Country Championships held in Aarhus, Denmark. He finished in 76th place. In 2021, he placed third in the 3000m steeplechase at the US Olympic Trials.  He competed in the men's 3000 metres steeplechase event at the 2020 Summer Olympics held in Tokyo, Japan.

Ferlic is a volunteer assistant coach at his alma mater, University of Michigan.

Personal Bests

References

External links 
 

Living people
1993 births
Place of birth missing (living people)
American male long-distance runners
American male cross country runners
American male steeplechase runners
University of Michigan College of Engineering alumni
Athletes (track and field) at the 2020 Summer Olympics
Olympic track and field athletes of the United States
Michigan Wolverines men's track and field athletes
21st-century American people